Bak Jeongyang (1841 – 1904) was a Korean Joseon dynasty politician and edification activist. a member of Independence Club (독립협회;獨立協會) and the People's Joint Association (만민공동회;萬民共同會). He was a supporter of the slow modernization of Korea under the Joseon dynasty and himself belonged to the Pannam Park clan. He was also the father of famous Korean playwright Park Seung-hee (1901-1964). 
Bak Jeongyang was appointed ambassador to the United States by the king in 1887. This diplomatic mission was strongly opposed by the Qing dynasty of China, which viewed Korea as a vassal state [citation needed: Joseon was enjoying Westphalian sovereignty at the time of the diplomatic mission]. After many years' conflict, Park was punished and ostracized. The episode is considered representative of Korea's desire for complete independence colliding with the Qing desire to maintain the traditional tributary ties, Park became a victim of this conflict. Park was also the author of a few books.

See also 
Bak Yeonghyo
Soh Jaipil
Yun Chi-ho
Syngman Rhee

Site web 
Bak Jeongyang 
Bak Jeongyang

References

Korean politicians
History of liberalism
Korean scholars
Korean Confucianists
19th-century Korean philosophers
1841 births
1904 deaths

Officials of the Korean Empire